Lütfiye is generally a female given name.

Given name
Lütfiye Aydın (born 1949), Turkish writer
Lütfiye Ercimen (born 1987), Turkish football player
Lutfiya al-Qaba'ili (born 1948), Journalist and writer

Lütfi
(Male variant)
Lütfi Elvan (born 1962), Turkish politician and engineer
Lutfiyar Imanov (1928–2008), Azerbaijani actor, opera singer
Lutfi Lepaja (born1945), Kosovan author